Michael Joseph is a South African businessman. He is currently Chairman of Kenya Airways, a position he has held since October 2016, and also chairs the Safaricom PLC board, having been appointed in August 2020. He was previously the CEO of Safaricom from July 2000 to November 2010, as Founder and CEO, and then again as acting CEO from July 2019 to March 2020.  He is also Chairman of the M-PESA Foundation and the M-PESA Foundation Academy. He was until recently (October 2017) Vodafone's Director of Mobile Money and was responsible for leading the strategic growth and development of successful M-PESA proposition across the Vodafone footprint.

Michael was the founding CEO of Safaricom Limited, steering the company from a subscriber base of less than 18,000 in 2000 to over 17 million subscribers at his retirement in November 2010 making it the most successful company in East Africa. This phenomenal growth straddling nearly a decade was notable for the launch of many innovative products and services and he was behind the launch of the highly successful launch and phenomenal growth of M-PESA and its related services.

Michael has been the recipient of many awards, including CEO of the year awarded by the Kenya Institute of Management, the Elder of the Order of the Burning Spear (awards given by the President of Kenya to those who have made a positive impact in Kenya).  He has extensive international experience in company start-ups, the implementation and operation of large wireless and wire-line networks. He is also a keen conservationist and serves as Chairman of Lewa Wildlife Conservancy, a leading conservancy in Northern Kenya.

controversy
Mr Joseph has multiple times been described as "Mr 10 percent" referring to accusation (sometimes with evidence) for always demanding for 10 percent of the cost of tenders safaricom gave while he was CEO.

References

Living people
Year of birth missing (living people)
Safaricom people
South African business executives